A Bhumka is the term for a traditional herbal healer in the valley of Patalkot, India.  The valley is mainly home to members of the Bharia and Gond tribes, with 2,000 residents scattered between various villages and hamlets.  Tribes people traditionally use herbal medicine, under the auspices of a herbal expert and holy man known as a Bhumka.

The indigenous knowledge of herbs and their healing properties has been investigated and scientifically documented by Abhumka Herbal Pvt Ltd. The name of the company Abhumka is derived from Bhumka. The company has worked among the Bhumkas and documented their herbal practices under the supervision of Dr Deepak Acharya. The Bhumkas' herbal healing knowledge is age old and it has been passed from generation to generations. Younger generations from these tribal groups are now interested in knowing the secrets of medicinal plants. Dr Deepak Acharya says, "There is a need of the hour to document Bhumka's herbal knowledge and convert it into cheap, sustainable and eco-friendly products with the help of modern streams of sciences." His company Abhumka Herbal Pvt Ltd has already taken positive steps in this regards.

References

External links
My Hero Foundation: Saving Knowledge of a Secret Forest

Chhindwara
Traditional healthcare occupations